Human. :II: Nature. (stylized as HVMAN. :: NATVRE.) is the ninth studio album by Finnish symphonic metal band Nightwish, released on 10 April 2020 by Nuclear Blast. It is the band's first double album, with the second CD complete with orchestral music rather than metal.

Following the departure of original drummer Jukka Nevalainen the previous year, this is the first album to feature Kai Hahto as official band member, although he had already acted as Nevalainen's replacement on the band's previous album, Endless Forms Most Beautiful. It is the sixth and final album to feature bassist/vocalist Marko Hietala before his departure in January 2021.

The album became the band's seventh consecutive album to top the Official Finnish Albums Chart.

Background and recording

Production 
Following a tour in support of the band's previous album, Endless Forms Most Beautiful, the band took a year-long break in which Jansen was focusing on her first child. Holopainen said in a 2016 interview that the band would continue between the years of 2018 and 2020, with another album that will continue the themes explored in Endless Forms Most Beautiful.

According to Tuomas Holopainen, after the creation of the previous album, which he described as "the band's best so far", he could not write new material for the next album because of his lack of inspiration, which was "emptied". In 2017, Holopainen, along with the singer and his wife Johanna Kurkela and the band's member Troy Donockley, formed the trio-band Auri to create a self-titled album. After the release of the album, Tuomas said that "all the flood gates opened" and he started to write new material for Nightwish.

In July 2018 while the band was out on tour, Holopainen stated that he had written "80 or 90%" of the material for Nightwish's next album, which would consist of ten or eleven songs. Recording would start in July 2019, for a planned Spring 2020 release. The band would "use the [orchestral] instrumentation in a different way than before", with Holopainen stating, "You want to search for some new ways of using it so that it doesn't end up sounding the same as before."

Jansen stated in November that she believed the recording process would be similar to Endless Forms Most Beautifuls, for which the band went through lengthy rehearsals before starting to record.

On 31 October 2019, Floor Jansen confirmed that recording for the new album had been completed, stating that she was "very, very happy" with it. Tuomas Holopainen was confirmed on 18 December 2019 to be at Finnvox Studios mixing Nightwish's upcoming studio album, set for release in the first quarter of 2020.

The mixing was done by Holopainen, Tero Kinnunen and Mikko Karmila, and mastering by Mika Jussila, at Finnvox Studios. On 10 January 2020, it was confirmed by Holopainen that the production was finished, and the album was ready for release. The album title, cover and other details were released on 16 January 2020, including the release date of 10 April 2020.

Composition

Influences, style and themes 
The album features a wide vocal collaboration between Marko Hietala, Troy Donockley and Jansen, which "brings a whole new sound in the band", according to Jansen. It can be reflected for example in first song in the album, "Music", which describes the history of music, "from the first rudimentary sounds to the music as we know today". This song starts with a long intro and described as very harmonic and melodic.

The second track, "Noise", has been described as a commentary on modern society. Following the release of the song's music video, when asked if the video was criticism towards technology or cell phones, Holopainen responded:

"Shoemaker" is about Eugene Shoemaker, whose biography inspired Holopainen to write a song. According to Jansen, the song lacks a typical structure. Consisting of operatic voices, the song was a challenge to Jansen to sing, and it took several times to record until the desired result. Johanna Kurkela, Holopainen's wife, took part in this song, performing a spoken part before Jansen's ending operatic part.

According to Donockley, the lyrics of "Harvest" consist of the meaning of the whole theme of the album and even of life.

According to Holopainen, "Pan" is described as an ode to the human imagination.

About "How's the Heart?", Holopainen had commented: "Human empathy, altruism, true love. They truly are the better angels of our nature. The nature of the human kind. We have the potential to be such a great species. And in many ways we already are. It is really important to remember to ask your family, your friends, strangers and yourself the important question: How's the Heart?"

On the topic of the seventh track on the album and the first track written, "Procession", Holopainen stated that the listener would have to delve into the lyrics to understand what the song is about, stating that the American television series Stranger Things was an influence for the song.

"Tribal" is described by Hahto as heavy and very percussive. This song along with other tracks in the album demanded Hahto to upgrade his drum kit. According to Hahto, this song is an example to the variety of the different musical styles presented in the whole album.

According to Hietala, the ninth track "Endlessness" is about "a 'multiversal' force so grand that it actually binds and permeates everything or all of our lives; just tiny particles in this mighty flow, and then there's this mere human vocalist and his friend a human being as well has written the story and we are in this rock pool; try to bring its unique loneliness across to other mere humans."

Release and promotion 
The first single of the album, "Noise", with an accompanying music video, was released on 7 February 2020. The second single from the album, "Harvest", was released on 6 March 2020 with a lyric video to accompany its release. On 11 March 2020, "Ad Astra", the last track of the album's second disc, was released in a video that revealed Nightwish's new partnership with World Land Trust.

Nightwish stated on 22 January 2020 that they became the "first band ever to be given permission" to do a photo shoot in the "legendary Cathedral that is the Natural History Museum, London", where they had four hours to themselves during the shoot.

On the day the album was released, Nightwish released lyric videos for all of the songs on the album.

In an interview with Floor Jansen, she had revealed the band had originally asked natural historian David Attenborough to speak on the album. She commented:

On 21 January 2021, the album was nominated at the Finnish Emma Awards for Album of the Year and Metal Album of the Year. The album ended up winning the category of Metal Album of the Year.

Tour

The band is currently touring in Europe, South America, Asia and North America in 2021 and 2022 in promotion of the album. The tour was originally scheduled to begin in spring 2020, but due to the COVID-19 pandemic, the band had postponed the tour to next year.

The band began their world tour in support of the album in May 2021 with an interactive livestream experience in a virtual reality built tavern which featured songs from the album. Both of the performances had broken records with the first drawing 150,000 viewers and setting it as the most viewed virtual performance in Finland, with the box office exceeding one million in euros. The band resumed their tour in Finland in late July 2021 with a "secret" performance in Oulu. The tour is set to conclude in June 2023.

Reception

Critical reception 

The album received generally positive reviews from music critics upon the album's release.

At Metacritic, which assigns a normalized rating out of 100 to reviews from mainstream critics, the album has an average score of 66 based on 4 reviews, indicating "generally favorable reviews". AllMusic gave the album a positive review, saying that "Human. :II: Nature....is, with one exception, a consistently and deeply satisfying outing that was worth waiting for." The exception, for them, was "Harvest", which they remark "just doesn't work".

Kerrang! gave the album 3 out of 5 and stated: "At its best, Hvman:||:Natvre has the impressive magic that has made Nightwish one of Europe's biggest bands. But there's a feeling this time that for such a big concept, things haven't gone quite far enough."

Louder Sound gave the album a positive review and stated: "You know a band feels pretty confident when they take liberties with the rules of the language of rock'n'roll. But however you pronounce the punctuation-incontinent title, Human. :II: Nature., Nightwish's first studio album for five years, doesn't try to confuse us any further."

Accolades

Track listing

Notes
 "All the Works of Nature Which Adorn the World" is listed on the back cover of the album as a single song, split into eight chapters.
 The earbook edition of the album includes a third disc with the instrumental version of disc one.

Personnel 
Credits for Human. :II: Nature. adapted from liner notes.

Nightwish
 Floor Jansenlead vocals, backing vocals (track 4)
 Emppu Vuorinenguitars
 Marko Hietalabass, lead vocals (track 9), acoustic guitar, backing vocals
 Kai Hahtodrums, percussion
 Tuomas Holopainenkeyboards, piano, production, recording, mixing
 Troy DonockleyUilleann pipes, low whistle, bouzouki, bodhran, digital aerophone, guitars, lead vocals (track 4), backing vocals

Additional personnel
 Tero Kinnunenproduction, engineering, mixing
 Mikko Karmilaproduction, engineering, mixing
 Mat Bartramorchestra engineering
 Laura Beckorchestra engineering assistant
 Mika Jussilamastering
 Geraldine Jamesspoken words on "All the Works of Nature Which Adorn the World" ("Vista", "Ad Astra")
 Johanna Kurkelaspoken words on "Shoemaker"
 Janne Pitkänen – cover art
 Pip Williamsorchestral and choir arrangements and directing
 Ilona Opulskaassistant to Williams
 James Shearmanconductor
 Martin Higginsassistant to Shearman
 Richard Ihnatowiczmusic preparation

Metro Voices
 Jenny O'Gradychoirmaster
 Alexandra Gibson, Alice Fearn, Ann de Renais, Anne Marie Cullum, Caroline Fitzgerald, Claire Henry, Davina Moon, Eleanor Meynell, Heather Cairncross, Helen Brooks, Helen Parker, Jacqueline Barron, Joanna Forbes, Kate Bishop, Mary Carewe, Rachel Weston, Rosemary Forbes Butler, Sarah Ryan, Soophia Foroughi, Andrew Busher, Andrew Playfoot, David Porter Thomas, Gerard O'Beirne, Ian McLarnon, Lawrence Wallington, Lawrence White, Michael Dore, Peter Snipp, Robin Bailey, Sebastian Charlesworth, Tom Pearce

Pale Blue Orchestra

 Isobel Griffithsorchestral contractor
 Andy Findonflute, alto flute
 Anna Noakesflute, piccolo
 John Andersonoboe, cor anglais
 Nicholas Bucknallclarinet
 Dave Fuestclarinet, bass clarinet
 Gavin McNaughtonbassoon, contrabassoon
 Nigel BlackFrench horn
 Martin OwenFrench horn
 Philip EastopFrench horn
 Andrew Crowleytrumpet
 Kate Mooretrumpet
 Mike Lovatttrumpet
 Andy Woodtenor trombone
 Ed Tarranttenor trombone
 Dave Stewartbass trombone
 Owen Sladetuba
 Stephen Hendersontimpani, ethnic percussion

 Frank Ricottiorchestral percussion
 Gary Kettelorchestral percussion
 Paul Clarvisethnic percussion
 Perry Montague-Masonviolin
 Emlyn Singletonviolin
 Chris Tomblingviolin
 John Bradburyviolin
 Emil Chakalovviolin
 Patrick Kiernanviolin
 Mark Berrowviolin
 Warren Zielinskiviolin
 Rita Manningviolin
 John Millsviolin
 Chris Tomblingviolin
 John Bradburyviolin
 Steve Morrisviolin
 Pete Hansonviolin
 Clio Gouldviolin

 Dai Emanuelviolin
 Daniel Bhattacharyaviolin
 Peter Laleviola
 Andy Parkerviola
 Julia Knightviola
 Kate Muskerviola
 Helen Kammingaviola
 Caroline Dalecello
 Martin Lovedaycello
 Frank Schaefercello
 Jonathan Williamscello
 Tim Gillcello
 Chris Worseycello
 Chris Laurencedouble bass
 Steve Mairdouble bass
 Stacey Wattondouble bass
 Skaila Kangaharp
 Dirk Campbellduduk, ethnic winds

Charts

Weekly charts

Year-end charts

References 

2020 albums
Nightwish albums
Nuclear Blast albums